NewDad are an indie rock band from Galway, Ireland. Their music has been compared to The Cure, Beabadoobee, and Just Mustard by NME magazine. Atwood Magazine wrote of the group: "The band oozes personality with cynical but honest lyrics, colorful visual components, and poignant messages about coping with the, albeit painful, formative experiences." The group have appeared at the Green Man Festival in Wales, the Pitchfork Music Festival in Paris, and on the Irish television program Other Voices.

Career

Formation and Early Career

Julie Dawson, Áindle O'Beirn and Fiachra Parslow started the band while in secondary school as a way of avoiding solo performances for their Leaving Certificate practical music exam. Sean O'Dowd, who was studying music technology in Limerick, began recording the band, before eventually becoming a full member. An early feature in local paper The Connacht Tribune wrote "Belying their relative inexperience, Galway band New Dad are fast becoming one of the city’s most inventive and enthralling acts."
The band released five singles in 2020; How, Swimming, Cry, Blue, and I Don't Recognise You, which accrued over two million streams on Spotify. On November 5, 2020, the group recorded a live session for Steve Lamacq's show on BBC 6 Music.

Waves EP
{{Album ratings
| rev1 = GoldenPlec
| rev1Score = 
| rev2= DIY
| rev2Score=
| rev3 = Dork
| rev3Score=
| noprose = yes}}
Their debut EP Waves was released in March 2021. Recorded with engineer Chris Ryan in Belfast, the EP features the previously released singles I Don't Recognise You and Blue. God Is in the TV wrote of the EP "Each song juxtaposes fuzzy guitar waves, dexterous basslines, subtle percussive beds, woven with Julie’s half spoken half sung vocals that are intimate, evocative and heart puncturing." In a 4-star review DIY magazine wrote of the tracks: "Together they offer a palpable melancholy, one driven by vocalist Julie Dawson’s intricate balance of despondency and bite, not least on the subtle spite on the closing title track." The Journal of Music opined: "NewDad posit themselves as both the lovelorn hero and the cut-throat antagonist, switching sides with ease." In a positive review, Far Out Magazine wrote: "Their debut EP is a well-rounded effort that shows a band who are rightly-confident in their abilities."

Banshee EP

In October 2021, the group released the single Ladybird and announced their second EP, Banshee EP. The EP was recorded with Chris Ryan in Belfast and mixed by John Congleton. In January 2022, BBC 6 Music premiered Say It, the second single from the EP. So Young Magazine wrote of the single; "‘Say It’ has NewDad sounding more confident and more ambitious." Banshee EP was released on February 7th 2022. Gigwise, giving it a score of nine out of ten stars, wrote; "NewDad look primed to set the world alight." GoldenPlec wrote; "the themes of ‘Banshee’ thoughtfully unfold through a dreamscape of helplessness, uncertainty, depression and neurosis." Dork (magazine) wrote of the EP; "Sonically expansive and colourful, it’s a brighter step up from last year’s ‘Waves EP’." and awarded it four stars out of five.

Personnel

 Julie Dawson (vocalist and rhythm guitarist)
 Cara Joshi (bass guitar)
 Sean O’Dowd (lead guitar)
 Fiachra Parslow (drums)

Discography

EPsWaves EP (2021)Banshee EP (2022)

SinglesHow (2020)Swimming (2020)Cry (2020)Blue (2020)I Don't Recognise You (2020)Ladybird (2021)Say It (2022)ILY2'' (2022)

References

External links 
NewDad on Bandcamp

Irish musical groups
2020 establishments in Ireland